Matthew Houghton Todd (born 13 January 1973) is a British chemist and the Professor and Chair of Drug Discovery of the School of Pharmacy at University College London. He is the founder of Open Source Malaria (OSM) and his research focuses on drug discovery and development for this disease. Recently, he has expanded to other areas, particularly neglected diseases such as tuberculosis and mycetoma in the Open Source Tuberculosis (OSTB) and Open Source Mycetoma (MycetOS) project, through a collaboration with the Drugs for Neglected Diseases Initiative and Erasmus MC. In addition, he has some research activity in catalysis and methodology.

Education 

Todd received an MA in Natural Sciences from the University of Cambridge in 1995. He obtained his PhD in Organic Chemistry at the same institution in 1999, working with Chris Abell on encoding and linker strategies for combinatorial chemistry. Todd was a Wellcome Trust Postdoctoral Research Fellow at the University of California, Berkeley from 1999 to 2000, working with Paul A. Bartlett on synthesis of amino acid-derived heterocycles by Lewis acid catalysis and radical cyclisations from peptide acetals.

Career and research 

From 2000 to 2001, he was a College Fellow and Lecturer at New Hall, Cambridge (now Murray Edwards College, Cambridge). He began his independent research career in 2001 at Queen Mary University of London. In 2005, he relocated to Australia where he was a Lecturer, Senior Lecturer, then Associate Professor at the School of Chemistry, University of Sydney. In 2018, he returned to the United Kingdom to take the role of professor and Chair of Drug Discovery at UCL School of Pharmacy.

In response to the price hike of HIV/AIDS drug, pyrimethamine (Daraprim), by Turing Pharmaceuticals, Todd and the Open Source Malaria team led a small team of high school students from Sydney Grammar School to synthesise the drug. The students produced 3.7 grams of pyrimethamine for US$20, which would be worth between US$35,000 and US$110,000 in the United States based on hiked prices. This received significant media attention and was featured on ABC, BBC, CNN, The Guardian, and Time.

Todd has been a vocal proponent of open science and open research. In 2011, he proposed Six Laws of Open Research to guide present and future open research projects including OSM and MycetOS:

Todd is on the Editorial boards of Chemistry Central Journal, ChemistryOpen, PLOS One, Scientific Reports, and Scientific Data.

Honours and awards 

 2011 – NSW Premier's Prize for Science & Engineering (Emerging Research)
 2012 – Wellcome Trust/Google/PLOS Accelerating Science Award
 2014 – Blue Obelisk Award
 2017 – Medicine Maker Power List
 2018 – Medicine Maker Power List
 2019 – Medicine Maker Power List
 2020 – Medicine Maker Power List
 2021 – Medicine Maker Power List

See also 

 Open access
 Open collaboration
 Open innovation
 Open science data
 Open Source Drug Discovery
 Open-source model

References

External links 

 Matthew H. Todd on Twitter
 Matthew H. Todd on ORCID
 Matthew H. Todd on Google Scholar
 Open Source Malaria
 Open Source Malaria on GitHub
 Open Source Malaria on Twitter
 Open Source Mycetoma on GitHub
 Open Source Mycetoma on Reddit
 Open Source Mycetoma on Twitter
 Open Source Pharma
 Open Source Tuberculosis
 Open Source Tuberculosis on GitHub
 Open Source Tuberculosis on Twitter

Organic chemists
English chemists
Living people
1973 births
Alumni of the University of Cambridge
Academics of University College London
Academics of Queen Mary University of London
People associated with the UCL School of Pharmacy